Password is a British panel game show based on the US version of the same name.

Gameplay
Gameplay is identical to the US version. Two celebrity-civilian teams compete, and after being given the password, the team in control has to decide whether to pass or play. Clues were worth 10 points if the player guessed the password on the first try, 9 on the second try, and so on down to 5 points for the last try (teams only got three guesses each in the UK version). The first side to earn 25 points won the game, and celebrities switched partners after each game. On Channel 4, the first player to win two games continued as champion. On later series, teams played best-of-five matches.

After a team accumulated 25 points or more, the points were turned into cash, at £1 per point. The winning team then played the lightning round, where teams had to guess 5 passwords in 60 seconds. Each word earned the contestant an extra £5 per word. On the Ulster series, the winner won £50 if the team guessed all 5.

On the Channel 4 series, winners of £500 retired until the semifinals.

Transmissions

ATV era

BBC era

Channel 4 era

UTV era

External links

1963 British television series debuts
1988 British television series endings
1960s British game shows
1970s British game shows
1980s British game shows
BBC panel games
British panel games
Channel 4 panel games
English-language television shows
ITV panel games
British television series based on American television series
Television series by Fremantle (company)
Television series by Mark Goodson-Bill Todman Productions
Television series by ITV Studios
Television shows produced by Thames Television
British television series revived after cancellation